The 1901 Texas A&M Aggies football team was an American football team that represented Texas A&M University as an independent during the 1901 college football season. In its third season under head coach W. A. Murray, the team compiled a 1–4 record in three games against Baylor and two games against the Texas Longhorns.

Schedule

References

Texas AandM
Texas A&M Aggies football seasons
Texas AandM Aggies football